Hector Varela may refer to:

Héctor Varela (musician) (1914–1987), Argentine tango Bandoneonist, bandleader and composer
Héctor Varela (author), Puerto Rican author
Héctor Benigno Varela, Argentina military leader